Chester Moor is a village in County Durham, England. It is situated a short distance to the south of Chester-le-Street.

References

Villages in County Durham